Mahendra Higher Secondary School is the oldest school in Darchula district, Nepal. The school operates through class six to ten and also plus two which is the Higher Education of Nepal. Students from Darchula district and from other districts attend the school. The school is named in honor of king Mahendra .

Educational institutions established in 1958
Secondary schools in Nepal
1958 establishments in Nepal